The Oscar Traynor Centre is an association football venue in Coolock, Northside, Dublin, Ireland. The ground has been home to Women's National League club Bohemians since 2020.

In September 1985 Jim Tunney officially opened the AFL Coaching and Development Centre, which had been constructed by Dublin's Amateur Football League (AFL) at a cost of approximately €688,000. The venue underwent significant expansion in 2001, when the North Dublin Schoolboys/girls League (NDSL) agreed to pool resources with the AFL. Floodlights, additional all-weather pitches and a separate club house elevated the facility to "a centre of coaching and soccer excellence".

In January 2012 the Evening Herald reported that the Oscar Traynor Centre "faced an uncertain future", as the AFL and NDSL were in dispute and the directors of the loss-making separate company running the centre had resigned. The NDSL subsequently entered into an arrangement with Bohemian FC in June 2013, which gave the League of Ireland club access to the Oscar Traynor Centre facilities. When Bohemians launched a senior Women's National League club in 2020 they based them at the Oscar Traynor Centre instead of at the main Dalymount Park stadium.

The ground is situated on the road from Coolock to Santry, which is named for former Football Association of Ireland President Oscar Traynor.

International
In June 2005 the Republic of Ireland women's national football team defeated the Faroe Islands 2–1 at the Oscar Traynor Centre, both goals scored by Carmel Kissane. The Republic of Ireland under-15 boys team beat Finland 1–0 at the Oscar Traynor Centre in April 2013.

References

External links
Oscar Traynor Coaching and Development Centre at NDSL.ie

Bohemian F.C.
Association football venues in County Dublin
Sports venues in County Dublin
1985 establishments in Ireland
Sports venues completed in 1985